An NIH shift is a chemical rearrangement where a hydrogen atom on an aromatic ring undergoes an intramolecular migration primarily during a hydroxylation reaction.  This process is also known as a 1,2-hydride shift.  These shifts are often studied and observed by isotopic labeling. An example of an NIH shift is shown below:

In this example, a hydrogen atom has been isotopically labeled using deuterium (shown in red).  As the hydroxylase adds a hydroxyl (the −OH group), the labeled site shifts one position around the aromatic ring relative to the stationary methyl group (−CH3).

Several hydroxylase enzymes are believed to incorporate an NIH shift in their mechanism, including 4-hydroxyphenylpyruvate dioxygenase and the tetrahydrobiopterin dependent hydroxylases.  The name NIH shift arises from the US National Institutes of Health from where studies first reported observing this transformation.

References
 .
 .

Enzymes
Post-translational modification
Reaction mechanisms